Maulvi Attaullah Omari is an Afghan Taliban politician and military personal who is currently serving as Deputy Minister of Technology and Logistics at Ministry of Defense since 4 March 2022. Omari has also served as Deputy Minister of Agriculture, Irrigation and Livestock from 23 September 2021 to 4 March 2022 and commander of Al-Fatah Corps from 4 October 2021 4 March 2022.

References

Living people
Taliban government ministers of Afghanistan
Taliban commanders
Year of birth missing (living people)